The GT26CW-2 is the Dash-2 variant of the GT26CW diesel-electric locomotive series created by the Electro-Motive Division (EMD) of General Motors for export to Iran, Israel, Morocco, Pakistan, Peru, South Korea, Turkey and Yugoslavia. Various licensees have also constructed or refurbished this model. It is similar to the highly successful SD40-2 North American locomotive.

Iran 
The Islamic Republic of Iran Railways (RAI)  purchased 80 GT26CW-2s along with 182 GT26CWs . All GT26CW locomotives were manufactured by General Motors Diesel Division of Chicago, Illinois, 20 GT26CW-2s were constructed by General Motors Diesel Division of London, Ontario and the remaining were built by Hyundai, a Korean licensee of General Motors Diesel Division.  Out of 262 GT26CW locomotives, 180 units are currently in revenue service.
All RAI locomotives have three 48-inch fans instead of 2 which is a necessary provision for hot climate of Iran.

Israel 
As of 2017, Israel Railways operates fourteen locomotives. It purchased one GT26CW-2 unit from EMD in 1989 for the purpose of hauling coal imported through the Port of Ashdod to the Rutenberg Power Station in Ashkelon until a dedicated coal pier was completed at the Rutenberg site in 2000. Since then the locomotive, numbered 701, has been used for general freight service on Israel Railways' network.

In the mid-2010s Israel Railways purchased thirteen units from NRE which were completely rebuilt by TŽV Gredelj from 11 Croatian Railways HŽ series 2062 GT26 units plus 2 new frames and designated as NGT26CW-3 variants. They were delivered to Israel Railways between August 2015 and December 2017 and numbered 710–722.

Morocco 

In Morocco, the GT26CW-2 is variously given the designations DH-350, DH-370, and DK 550, depending on its usage.

Peru 
The Empresa Nacional de Ferrocarriles del Peru (Enafer) operated SIX JT26CW-2s, on the section that would later become the Andean Central Railway. These were a unique variant of the model produced by Brazilian Corporation Villares, which is now GEVISA. After ENAFER was privatized, the remaining units fell into hands of the recently created private empress. Out of the 6 units, only 3 remain on service.

South Korea 
From December 1989 to October 2000, the Korean National Railroad received GT26CW-2s from Electro-Motive Division and Hyundai Rolling Stock Co. (present:Hyundai Rotem) The locomotives are used for freight service, Mugunghwa passenger trains, Saemaul passenger trains, and excursion trains (G-Train, S-Train, and the Haerang). on all Korail lines, though some are currently owned by the Korea Rail Network Authority.

Very little is known about their construction. However, it is known that 83 units were constructed between December 1989 and October 1996 as the 7300-series, units 7301–7383, were constructed between December 1996 and May 1998 as 7400-series units 7401-7414 and 7500-series units 7557–7583, and 70 units were constructed between November 1998 and October 2000 as 7400-series units 7415–7484.

Turkey 

The Turkish State Railways received 89 units built by Tülomsaş between 2003 and 2009. The units are numbered TCDD DE33000. They have the latest innovations of the GT26 series, mainly noticed by a spacier cab view.

Yugoslavia 
The Yugoslav Railways (Jugoslavenske Željeznice) received 14 GM GT26CW-2s from EMD. Mainly used for freight and passenger trains between Knin and Split (today part of M604 railway (Croatia)). All locomotives went to service on Hrvatske Željeznice after the breakup of Yugoslavia in 1991. They are now classified as HŽ series 2063. In the meanwhile, some were sold to NRE which then completely rebuilt and refurbished them in Croatia before selling some of them to Israel Railways.

Pictures

See also 
EMD SD40-2, a similar locomotive for the North American loading gauge
List of GM-EMD locomotives
List of GMD Locomotives

References

Sources 
2063 at zeljeznice.net (in Croatian)
GT26CW at trainweb.org
TCDD DE 33000 at tulomsas.com.tr
TCDD DE 33000 at tulomsas.com.tr (in Turkish)

G26TCW
Diesel-electric locomotives of South Korea
Diesel-electric locomotives of Turkey
Diesel-electric locomotives of Yugoslavia
Railway locomotives introduced in 1972
Diesel-electric locomotives of Peru
Diesel-electric locomotives of Croatia
Diesel-electric locomotives of Iran
Diesel-electric locomotives of Israel
Diesel-electric locomotives of Morocco
Diesel-electric locomotives of Pakistan
Standard gauge locomotives of Iran
G26TCW-2
Standard gauge locomotives of South Korea
Standard gauge locomotives of Turkey
Standard gauge locomotives of Yugoslavia
Standard gauge locomotives of Peru
Standard gauge locomotives of Croatia
Standard gauge locomotives of Israel
Standard gauge locomotives of Morocco
Standard gauge locomotives of Pakistan

ko:7300호대 디젤 기관차